The Patinoire de Mériadeck is a sports complex located in Bordeaux, France, which is primarily used for ice hockey. It opened in 1981 and also operates as a concert venue throughout the year. The rink can seat 3,200 for hockey and 4,800 for concerts.

References

Indoor arenas in France
Concert halls in France
Sports venues in Bordeaux
Ice hockey venues in France